Rich Rocks is the first extended play (or "Six Pak," as referred to on the album cover) by American country music artist John Rich, one half of the duo Big & Rich. Rich co-wrote all of the songs on the EP with the exception of "Let Somebody Else Drive", which is a John Anderson cover. On four of the six tracks, Rich is introduced by a friend that is also in the music industry.  Originally slated for a late 2010 release, it was pushed back to May 17, 2011, to coincide with the release of John Rich's other EP, For the Kids. Reprise Records released both Rich Rocks and For the Kids.

The album includes the single "Country Done Come to Town", which charted at number 34 on Hot Country Songs.

Track listing

Personnel
Paul Allen - electric guitar
Mike Brignardello - bass guitar
Cowboy Troy - vocals on "Texas"
Chad Cromwell - drums
Shannon Forrest - drums, drum loops
Wes Hightower - background vocals
Kid Rock - vocals on "Mack Truck"
Lil Jon - vocals on "You Had Me from Hell No"
Brent Mason - electric guitar
John Rich - lead vocals
Mike Rojas - Hammond B-3 organ, piano, synthesizer
Adam Shoenfeld - electric guitar
Jimmie Lee Sloas - bass guitar
Joe Spivey - fiddle
Ilya Toshinsky - banjo, acoustic guitar, resonator guitar
Hank Williams Jr. - vocals on "Let Somebody Else Drive"
Jonathan Yudkin - banjo, fiddle

Chart performance

Album

Singles

References

2011 debut EPs
John Rich EPs
Warner Records EPs
Albums produced by John Rich